China National Highway 217 (G217) runs south from Altay, Xinjiang to Hotan, Xinjiang. It is 1,753 kilometres in length and runs southwest from Altay towards Kuqa County and from there southwards through the Taklamakan Desert to Hotan.

The section between Dushanzi and Kuqa crosses the Tianshan Mountains and is commonly known as Duku Highway (独库公路).

Route and distance

Mountain Passes 
From North to South:

 Haxilegen Pass, bypassed by tunnel. 3450 meters above the sea level.
 Yuximole Pass, bypassed by tunnel. 3438 meters above the sea level.
 Laerdun Pass. 2730 meters above the sea level.
 Tielimaiti Pass. bypassed by tunnel. 3335 meters above the sea level.

See also
 China National Highways

External links
Official website of Ministry of Transport of PRC

217
Transport in Xinjiang